In geometry, a tridecagon or triskaidecagon or 13-gon is a thirteen-sided polygon.

Regular tridecagon

A regular tridecagon is represented by Schläfli symbol {13}.

The measure of each internal angle of a regular tridecagon is approximately 152.308 degrees, and the area with side length a is given by

Construction
As 13 is a Pierpont prime but not a Fermat prime, the regular tridecagon cannot be constructed using a compass and straightedge. However, it is constructible using neusis, or an angle trisector.

The following is an animation from a neusis construction of a regular tridecagon with radius of circumcircle  according to Andrew M. Gleason, based on the angle trisection by means of the Tomahawk (light blue).

An approximate construction of a regular tridecagon using straightedge and compass is shown here.

Another possible animation of an approximate construction, also possible with using straightedge and compass.

Based on the unit circle r = 1 [unit of length]
 Constructed side length in GeoGebra 
 Side length of the tridecagon 
 Absolute error of the constructed side length:
 Up to the maximum precision of 15 decimal places, the absolute error is 
 Constructed central angle of the tridecagon in GeoGebra (display significant 13 decimal places, rounded) 
 Central angle of tridecagon 
 Absolute angular error of the constructed central angle:
 Up to 13 decimal places, the absolute error is

Example to illustrate the error
At a circumscribed circle of radius r = 1 billion km (a distance which would take light approximately 55 minutes to travel), the absolute error on the side length constructed would be less than 1 mm.

Symmetry

The regular tridecagon has Dih13 symmetry, order 26. Since 13 is a prime number there is one subgroup with dihedral symmetry: Dih1, and 2 cyclic group symmetries: Z13, and Z1.

These 4 symmetries can be seen in 4 distinct symmetries on the tridecagon. John Conway labels these by a letter and group order. Full symmetry of the regular form is r26 and no symmetry is labeled a1. The dihedral symmetries are divided depending on whether they pass through vertices (d for diagonal) or edges (p for perpendiculars), and i when reflection lines path through both edges and vertices. Cyclic symmetries in the middle column are labeled as g for their central gyration orders.

Each subgroup symmetry allows one or more degrees of freedom for irregular forms. Only the g13 subgroup has no degrees of freedom but can seen as directed edges.

Numismatic use
The regular tridecagon is used as the shape of the Czech 20 korun coin.

Related polygons
A tridecagram is a 13-sided star polygon. There are 5 regular forms given by Schläfli symbols: {13/2}, {13/3}, {13/4}, {13/5}, and {13/6}. Since 13 is prime, none of the tridecagrams are compound figures.

Petrie polygons
The regular tridecagon is the Petrie polygon 12-simplex:

References

External links
 

Polygons by the number of sides